Edgar Schmitt (born 29 April 1963) is a German former professional footballer who played as a striker. He notably scored four goals in Karlsruher SC's 7–0 win against Valencia CF in the second round of the 1993–94 UEFA Cup, a win which came to be known as the "Wunder vom Wildpark". That season he also became the competition's top scorer with 8 goals, alongside Dennis Bergkamp. Following his retirement as a player, he went into coaching and was most recently manager of TSV Essingen.

References

1963 births
Living people
People from Bitburg-Prüm
German footballers
West German footballers
Footballers from Rhineland-Palatinate
Association football forwards
1. FC Saarbrücken players
SV Eintracht Trier 05 players
Eintracht Frankfurt players
Karlsruher SC players
SC Fortuna Köln players
Bundesliga players
German football managers
3. Liga managers
VfR Aalen managers
Stuttgarter Kickers managers
KFC Uerdingen 05 managers